Rusty James is a fictional character in author S. E. Hinton's 1975 novel Rumble Fish. The book was adapted to film and directed by Francis Ford Coppola in 1983. In the film, Rusty-James is played by Matt Dillon. In the book, Rusty James is a tall 14 year old kid in Junior High School with dark red hair and Hershey brown eyes.

Cultural impact 
In 2012, Green Day released the album ¡Uno!, which includes a song named "Rusty James". The song talks about the former gangs,  as mentioned in the book.

External links 
 Rusty James at the Internet Movie Database
 

Male characters in literature
Child characters in literature
Literary characters introduced in 1975